Brad Lambert (born January 14, 1965) is an American college football coach who is currently the co-defensive coordinator and linebackers coach at Wake Forest University. He was the head coach of the Charlotte 49ers until November 18, 2018, and helped transition the 49ers football program from conception through a two year stint in the Football Championship Subdivision to the Football Bowl Subdivision in 2015, when the program joined the rest of the 49ers' sports in programs in Conference USA.

Playing career

Kansas State
Lambert played defensive back for the Kansas State Wildcats, lettering for four straight seasons and graduating in 1987. He earned second-team all-Big Eight honors his freshman season. He also was an all-Big Eight Academic choice from 1984 to 1986.

Coaching career

Oklahoma
Lambert began his coaching career as a graduate assistant with the Oklahoma Sooners.

Marshall
Lambert's first assistant coaching position was under head coach Jim Donnan with the Marshall Thundering Herd from 1990 to 1995. While at Marshall, Lambert participated in four NCAA Division I-AA Football Championship Games with Marshall winning the 1992 NCAA Division I-AA Football Championship.

Georgia
Lambert continued to work for Coach Donnan when the latter became head coach for the Georgia Bulldogs, coaching there from 1996 to 2000. At Georgia Lambert coached in the 1998 Outback Bowl, the 1998 Peach Bowl, the 2000 Outback Bowl, and the 2000 Oahu Bowl. Georgia compiled a 40–19 record during Lambert's time with the Bulldogs.

Wake Forest
After the 2000 football season, Lambert accepted the linebacker coaching position under head coach Jim Grobe with the Wake Forest Demon Deacons. In 2007 Lambert was promoted to defensive coordinator for the Demon Deacons. At Wake Forest Lambert was part of the 2006 ACC Championship Game team. He coached 2008 Butkus Award winner Aaron Curry, who would go on to play in the NFL and eventually serve as an assistant coach for Lambert at Charlotte.

Charlotte
Lambert was hired as the first-ever head football coach for the Charlotte 49ers on March 1, 2011  In his first game, Lambert led the 49ers to a decisive 52–7 victory at home over the Campbell Fighting Camels.  Lambert led the 49ers to a 5–6 record in their inaugural season.  On September 4, 2015, Lambert led the 49ers to their first FBS victory, over the Georgia State Panthers. The team failed to have a winning season during its first four seasons, finishing the 2017 season with a 1–11 record and going 12–36 over the course of four FBS seasons. Lambert was released by Charlotte on November 18, 2018 effective after the season, after going 22–48 in six seasons.

Marshall

Lambert returned to Marshall to serve as a defensive assistant and likely defensive coordinator. After his contract terms with Charlotte were negotiated, Thundering Herd coach Doc Holliday named Lambert his defensive coordinator.

Purdue

Lambert was hired as a co-defensive coordinator and linebackers coach at Purdue in 2021.

Wake Forest (second stint)
In 2022 Lambert returned to Wake Forest, replacing Lyle Hemphill as the team’s defensive coordinator.

Personal
Lambert is married and has three children.

Head coaching record

References

External links
 Wake Forest profile

1965 births
Living people
American football defensive backs
Charlotte 49ers football coaches
Georgia Bulldogs football coaches
Kansas State Wildcats football players
Marshall Thundering Herd football coaches
Oklahoma Sooners football coaches
Purdue Boilermakers football coaches
Wake Forest Demon Deacons football coaches
People from Hoxie, Kansas
Coaches of American football from Kansas
Players of American football from Kansas